Vicente Dauder Guardiola (25 November 1924 – 9 February 2001) was a Spanish football goalkeeper and manager.

Honours

Player
Atlético Madrid
La Liga: 1950–51
Eva Duarte Cup: 1951

Manager
Las Palmas
Segunda División: 1963–64

Sabadell
Segunda División B: 1983–84

Eldense
Tercera División: 1961–62

Castellón
Tercera División: 1968–69

Gimnàstic de Tarragona
Tercera División: 1971–72

Terrassa
Tercera División: 1974–75

Andorra
Tercera División: 1979–80

External links
 
 
 Vicente Dauder biography 

1924 births
2001 deaths
People from Valencia
Spanish footballers
Footballers from the Valencian Community
Association football goalkeepers
La Liga players
CF Badalona players
CE Europa footballers
Gimnàstic de Tarragona footballers
Atlético Madrid footballers
RC Celta de Vigo players
Hércules CF players
Alicante CF footballers
Spanish football managers
La Liga managers
UE Figueres managers
Alicante CF managers
UD Las Palmas managers
Hércules CF managers
RCD Mallorca managers
CD Castellón managers
Gimnàstic de Tarragona managers
Levante UD managers
FC Andorra managers
CE Sabadell FC managers
CD Eldense managers